These are the results of the boxing competition at the 1932 Summer Olympics in Los Angeles.  Medals were awarded in eight weight classes. The competitions were held from August 9 to 13.

Participating nations
A total of 85 boxers from 18 nations competed at the Los Angeles Games:

NOTE: Including one South Korean boxer, who competed for Japan.''

Medal summary

Medal table

References

External links
 International Olympic Committee medal database

 
1932 Summer Olympics events
1932
1932 in boxing